Dialectica is a genus of moths in the family Gracillariidae.

Species

Dialectica aemula (Meyrick, 1916)
Dialectica anselmella Guillermet, 2011
Dialectica carcharota (Meyrick, 1912)
Dialectica columellina (Vári, 1961)
Dialectica cordiaecola Vári, 1961
Dialectica ehretiae (Vári, 1961)
Dialectica galactozona Vári, 1961
Dialectica galapagosensis Landry, 2006
Dialectica geometra (Meyrick, 1916)
Dialectica hedemanni (Rebel, 1896)
Dialectica imperialella (Zeller, 1847)
Dialectica japonica Kumata & Kuroko, 1988
Dialectica odontosema (Vári, 1961)
Dialectica pavonicola (Vári, 1961)
Dialectica permixtella Walsingham, 1897
Dialectica praegemina (Meyrick, 1917)
Dialectica pyramidota (Meyrick, 1918)
Dialectica rendalli Walsingham, 1897
Dialectica sanctaecrucis Walsingham, 1897
Dialectica scalariella (Zeller, 1850)
Dialectica soffneri (Gregor & Povolný, 1965)
Dialectica trigonidota (Vári, 1961)

External links

 Global Taxonomic Database of Gracillariidae (Lepidoptera)

 
Acrocercopinae
Gracillarioidea genera
Taxa named by Thomas de Grey, 6th Baron Walsingham